38th Wing or 38 Wing may refer to:

 No. 38 Wing RAF, a unit of the United Kingdom Royal Air Force
 38th Combat Support Wing, formerly 38th Engineering Installation Wing, a unit of the United States Air Force
 38th Bombardment Wing, a unit of the United States Air Force
 38th Tactical Missile Wing, a unit of the United States Air Force

See also
 38th Division (disambiguation)
 38th Brigade (disambiguation)
 38th Regiment (disambiguation)
 38 Squadron (disambiguation)